David Mateus (born 7 February 1980) is a Portuguese rugby union footballer. His position in the field is as a wing or center.

He played for Belenenses. Mateus has a twin brother, Diogo Mateus, with whom he played in the 2008 Hong Kong Sevens as part of the Portugal national rugby union team.

He had 37 caps for Portugal, from 2003 to 2010, scoring 4 tries, 20 points on aggregate. He was present at the "Lobos" squad that entered the 2007 Rugby World Cup, where he played in the matches against Scotland and Italy, without scoring.

References

External links
Player profile at Scrum.com

1980 births
Living people
Portuguese rugby union players
Rugby union wings
Portuguese twins
Twin sportspeople
Portugal international rugby sevens players
Rugby union players from Lisbon
Portugal international rugby union players